Mark Daniel Bott is an English first-class cricketer. He was born in Nottingham, England and is Jewish.

Playing career 
His batting style is right-hand bat. Among other teams, he has played for Cambridge University Centre of Cricketing Excellence (Main FC: 2006-09); Bedfordshire County Cricket Club (Minor Counties Championship: 2009); Cambridgeshire County Cricket Club (Minor Counties Trophy: 2007); and Bedfordshire (Minor Counties Trophy: 2009).

In 2008, Bott was named along with Jason Molins and Darren Gerard to the Maccabi GB cricket team to represent the United Kingdom at the 2009 Maccabiah Games.

He won a silver medal with Great Britain at the 2017 Maccabiah Games.

See also
List of select Jewish cricketers

Footnotes

References 
 

1986 births
Living people
English Jews
Jewish cricketers
English cricketers
Maccabiah Games competitors for Great Britain
Maccabiah Games medalists in cricket
Bedfordshire cricketers
Cambridgeshire cricketers
Jewish British sportspeople
Maccabiah Games silver medalists for Great Britain
Competitors at the 2009 Maccabiah Games
Competitors at the 2017 Maccabiah Games
Maccabiah Games silver medalists for Canada
Cambridge MCCU cricketers